Indian slavery may refer to:

Slavery in India
Slavery among the indigenous peoples of the Americas
Slavery among Native Americans in the United States